Calendula suffruticosa is a species of herb in the family Asteraceae. It has a self-supporting growth form and broad leaves.

Subspecies
The species is highly variable throughout its range, and multiple subspecies are recognised:
 Calendula suffruticosa subsp. algarbiensis (Boiss.) Nyman: coastal areas from Galicia to western Algarve
 Calendula suffruticosa subsp. balansae (Boiss. & Reut.) Ohle: Algeria
 Calendula suffruticosa subsp. boissieri Lanza: North Africa
 Calendula suffruticosa subsp. carbonellii Lanza: southern Iberian Peninsula, in coastal cliffs between Gibraltar and Málaga
 Calendula suffruticosa subsp. cinerea (Ohle) P.Silveira & A.C.Gonç.: Cape Saint Vincent, Portugal
 Calendula suffruticosa subsp. fulgida (Raf.) Guadagno: Italy, Malta and Turkey
 Calendula suffruticosa subsp. greuteri Ohle: endemic to Andalusia
 Calendula suffruticosa subsp. lusitanica (Boiss.) Ohle: inland rocky ares in central Portugal, with isolated populations in the Monchique range and Morocco
 Calendula suffruticosa subsp. maderensis (DC.) Govaerts: Madeira
 Calendula suffruticosa subsp. marginata (Willd.) Maire: endemic to a small area from Punta Carnero, Spain to Gibraltar
 Calendula suffruticosa subsp. maritima (Guss.) Meikle: Sardinia and Sicily
 Calendula suffruticosa subsp. monardii (Boiss. & Reut.) Ohle: Algeria
 Calendula suffruticosa subsp. suffruticosa: northwest Africa and Canary Islands
 Calendula suffruticosa subsp. tlemcensis Ohle: Algeria
 Calendula suffruticosa subsp. tomentosa (Ball) Murb.: southern Spain, in low elevation sandy loams from Punta Camarinal to east of the Guadalmesí River
 Calendula suffruticosa subsp. trialata P.Silveira & A.C.Gonç.: southwestern Spain (Cádiz), Cape Cires in Morocco
 Calendula suffruticosa subsp. vejerensis P.Silveira & A.C.Gonç.: endemic to calcereous sandstones in Vejer de la Frontera, in southern Spain.

References

Sources

suffruticosa
Endemic biota of Europe
Taxa named by Martin Vahl
Plants described in 1791